Clarita Heath (August 27, 1916 – October 13, 2003) was an American alpine skier. She competed in the women's combined event at the 1936 Winter Olympics.

References

External links
 

1916 births
2003 deaths
American female alpine skiers
Olympic alpine skiers of the United States
Alpine skiers at the 1936 Winter Olympics
Sportspeople from Pasadena, California
20th-century American women
21st-century American women